Lovers Like Us (also known in English as Call Me Savage) is a 1975 adventure romantic comedy film co-written and directed by Jean-Paul Rappeneau, starring Yves Montand and Catherine Deneuve. The film was a commercial success with a total of 2,373,738 admissions in France and was the 12th highest-grossing film of the year.

Plot
Scant days before her wedding to Vittorio, Nelly has a change of heart and runs away. As Vittorio pursues her through Caracas, she turns for help first to Alex, a previous employer, and then to Martin, a middle-aged French man she meets by chance. Martin drives her to the airport, where she gets a plane ticket to Paris. Returning by boat to his peaceful lonely life on an island off the coast, Martin is surprised and dismayed to find that Nelly has made her way there ahead of him. When he tries to return her to the mainland she sabotages the boat, causing it to sink. Marooned upon the island, Martin is forced to adapt to his new neighbor, who is determined to stay.

Cast
 Yves Montand as Martin
 Catherine Deneuve as Nelly
 Luigi Vannucchi as Vittorio
 Tony Roberts as Alex Fox
 Bobo Lewis as Miss Mark
 Dana Wynter as Jessie Coutances
 Gabriel Cattand as Mr. Delouis
 Vernon Dobtcheff as Mr. Coleman
 Jean Guidoni as musician

Reception
The film recorded admissions of 2,373,738 in France.

References

External links
 
 
 
 

1975 films
1975 romantic comedy films
1970s adventure comedy films
1970s French films
1970s French-language films
1970s Italian films
Films directed by Jean-Paul Rappeneau
Films scored by Michel Legrand
Films set in the Caribbean
Films set in Venezuela
Films set on uninhabited islands
Films shot in the Bahamas
Films shot in Venezuela
Films with screenplays by Jean-Loup Dabadie
Films with screenplays by Jean-Paul Rappeneau
French adventure comedy films
French romantic comedy films
French-language Italian films
Italian adventure comedy films
Italian romantic comedy films